George Marcellus Landers (February 22, 1813 – March 27, 1895) was a U.S. Representative from Connecticut.

Biography
Born in Lenox, Massachusetts, Landers attended public school.
He moved to New Britain, Connecticut, in 1830 and engaged in the manufacture of hardware.
He served as member of the Connecticut House of Representatives in 1851, 1867, and 1874.
He served in the Connecticut Senate in 1853, 1869, and 1873.
He served as President pro tempore of the Connecticut Senate.
He was State bank commissioner in 1874.

Landers was elected as a Democrat to the Forty-fourth and Forty-fifth Congresses (March 4, 1875 – March 3, 1879).
He died in New Britain, Connecticut, March 27, 1895.
He was interred in Fairview Cemetery.

References

1813 births
1895 deaths
Democratic Party Connecticut state senators
Democratic Party members of the Connecticut House of Representatives
Presidents pro tempore of the Connecticut Senate
Democratic Party members of the United States House of Representatives from Connecticut
19th-century American politicians
Mayors of New Britain, Connecticut
People from Lenox, Massachusetts